The Regional District of Bulkley–Nechako (RDBN) is a regional district in the Canadian province of British Columbia, Canada. As of the 2016 census, the population was 37,896. The area is 73,419.01 square kilometres.  The regional district offices are in Burns Lake.

Its geographical components are the Bulkley Valley, the northern part of the Nechako Country, and the Omineca Country, including portions of the Hazelton Mountains and Omineca Mountains in the west and north of the regional district, respectively.  The dominant landform is the Nechako Plateau.  Neighbouring regional districts are the Kitimat-Stikine, Central Coast, Cariboo, Fraser-Fort George, and Peace River Regional Districts; on its north the boundary with the southern edge of the remote Stikine Region is separated from the Bulkley–Nechako Regional District by the 56th parallel north.  The boundaries of the regional district near-entirely coincide with the territory of the Dakelh or Carrier peoples, and also some of that of the Dunneza (Beaver), but their reserves and governments lie outside the regional district system.  Roughly identical in area to the old New Caledonia fur district in the days of the North West Company, it is still sometimes referenced as New Caledonia, but while trapping continues in some area, its economy is now based in forestry, mining, tourism (mostly ranching in southern areas).

Municipalities

Demographics

Note: Totals greater than 100% due to multiple origin responses.

Notes

References

Statistics Canada 2016 Community Profile: Bulkley–Nechako (Regional district)

External links

 
Bulkley-Nechako